HSwMS Visborg (A265) previously (M03), was a command/auxiliary ship in the Swedish Navy and was a part of the 4th Naval Warfare Flotilla. She was decommissioned 2010. HSwMS Trossö is going to replace her role as a support ship at the 4th Naval Warfare Flotilla.

History 
She served as a minelayer from 1976 until 1999 when she was refitted to her current role as a command ship. Her sister ship  HSwMS Älvsborg was sold to the Chilean Navy 1997 and renamed Almirante José Toribio Merino Castro. The last conscripts served during the year 2010 and also honoured the royal wedding with their presence the same year.

In 2013 Visborg was delivered to Oresund Dry Docks in Landskrona, Sweden, for breaking.

References 

 4th Naval Warfare Flotilla - HMS Visborg 
 Örlogsboken 2003 

Auxiliary ships of the Swedish Navy
1974 ships
Ships built in Karlskrona